Kamaria Durant (born 24 February 1991) is a Trinidadian sprinter. She competed in the 200 metres event at the 2015 World Championships in Athletics in Beijing, China.

References

External links

1991 births
Living people
Trinidad and Tobago female sprinters
World Athletics Championships athletes for Trinidad and Tobago
Place of birth missing (living people)
Athletes (track and field) at the 2018 Commonwealth Games
Commonwealth Games competitors for Trinidad and Tobago
Athletes (track and field) at the 2019 Pan American Games
Pan American Games competitors for Trinidad and Tobago